Neil Masters (born 25 May 1972) is a Northern Irish football coach and former player.

Career
Masters was born in Ballymena, Northern Ireland. A left-back during his active career, played English league football for Bournemouth, Wolverhampton and Gillingham.

In August 1995, he was called up to the Northern Ireland national team's squad UEFA Euro 1996 qualifying match against Portugal but had to withdraw due to knee problems.

He joined Norwegian club Moss FK ahead of the 2001 season.

Having retired as a player after the 2003 season, he was hired as coach of Rygge FK, a fourth-tier Norwegian club located near Moss.

References

External links
 

1972 births
Living people
Sportspeople from Ballymena
Association football fullbacks
Association footballers from Northern Ireland
AFC Bournemouth players
Wolverhampton Wanderers F.C. players
Gillingham F.C. players
Moss FK players
Expatriate footballers in Norway
Expatriate association footballers from Northern Ireland
Eliteserien players
Football managers from Northern Ireland